Tomáš Zápotoka (born 4 February 1987, in Bardejov) is a Slovak football player who currently plays for FK Drustav Svidník.

External links
at official club website 

1987 births
Living people
Slovak footballers
FK Dubnica players
Slovak expatriate sportspeople in the Czech Republic
Slovak expatriate footballers
MFK Karviná players
Partizán Bardejov players
Slovak Super Liga players
People from Bardejov
Sportspeople from the Prešov Region
Expatriate footballers in the Czech Republic
Association football forwards